Herbert Schilling (20 June 1930 – 24 October 2004) was a German boxer. He competed in the men's light welterweight event at the 1952 Summer Olympics.

References

1930 births
2004 deaths
German male boxers
Olympic boxers of Germany
Boxers at the 1952 Summer Olympics
Sportspeople from Frankfurt
Light-welterweight boxers